Kim Jin-il (born January 26, 1984), better known by his stage name Jerry.K, is a South Korean rapper and head of the hip hop record label Daze Alive. He was previously a member of the hip hop duo Loquence with rapper Makesense.

Discography

Studio albums

Extended plays

Awards and nominations

References

External links 

 Jerry.K official website 
 Daze Alive official website

1984 births
Living people
South Korean male rappers